Gardiki, older form Gardikion, is a Greek toponym derived from proto-Slavic Gordьkь, "town, fortified settlement" (cf. Grad (toponymy)), and may refer to the following villages in Greece and Albania:

Greek for Kardhiq, a village in southern Albania
Gardiki Omilaion, a village in Phthiotis, part of Spercheiada 
Gardiki, Thesprotia, a village in Thesprotia, part of Souli 
Gardiki, Filiates, a village in Thesprotia, part of Filiates
Gardiki, Phthiotis, a village in Phthiotis regional unit, now named Pelasgia
Gardiki, Trikala, a village in the Trikala regional unit
Mega Gardiki, a village in the Ioannina regional unit, part of Pasaronas
Gardiki Castle, Corfu, castle on Corfu island built in the 13th century AD 
Gardiki Castle, Arcadia, castle near Chirades, municipality of Megalopoli
An older name for the village of Anavryto, Arcadia
Gardikaki ("Little Gardiki"), an older name for the village of Oiti in Phthiotis
Palaiogardiki ("Old Gardiki"), site of the ancient city of Pelinna, in Thessaly